The Koh Rong Island bent-toed gecko (Cyrtodactylus kohrongensis) is a species of gecko endemic to Cambodia.

References

Cyrtodactylus
Reptiles described in 2020
Reptiles of Cambodia
Endemic fauna of Cambodia